Andrei Nikolaevich Kovalenko (born June 7, 1970) is a Russian former professional ice hockey forward. He played in the National Hockey League with the Quebec Nordiques, Colorado Avalanche, Montreal Canadiens, Edmonton Oilers, Philadelphia Flyers, Carolina Hurricanes and the Boston Bruins. He is currently the chairman of the Kontinental Hockey League players association (KHL PA).

Playing career
Nicknamed "The Tank" by his teammates because of his immovable presence from the goal crease, Kovalenko was drafted 148th overall in the 1990 NHL Entry Draft by the Quebec Nordiques while playing in Russia for HC CSKA Moscow.

Kovalenko was traded from the Colorado Avalanche to the Montreal Canadiens with Jocelyn Thibault and Martin Ručínský for Patrick Roy and Mike Keane. In 1996, he scored the final goal in the history of the Montreal Forum, the fourth in a 4–1 victory over the Dallas Stars.

In 1999, Kovalenko scored the first goal in the history of the RBC Center as a member of the Carolina Hurricanes in a 4–2 loss to the New Jersey Devils.

Kovalenko last played in the National Hockey League in 2000–01 with the Boston Bruins, and finished his career playing in the Russian Super League for Lokomotiv Yaroslavl, Avangard Omsk, and Severstal Cherepovets.

Kovalenko is the father of Nikolai Kovalenko, who was drafted by the Colorado Avalanche in the 2018 NHL Entry Draft.

Member of parliament
In September 2020 Kovalenko was elected deputy of the State Duma, Russia's lower house, at a special election in Yaroslavl constituency No. 194, defeating long-time governor of Yaroslavl Oblast Anatoly Lisitsyn from left-leaning A Just Russia. Kovalenko was a candidate of ruling United Russia. A year later, in the 2021 elections Lisitsyn won the constituency with 36.5% of the vote, while Kovalenko received 27.3%.

Career statistics

Regular season and playoffs

International

Awards and achievements
Soviet championship:  1989 (with CSKA)
European Ice Hockey Cup:  1990 (with CSKA)
Russian championship:  2002 (with Lokomotiv Yaroslavl)
Russian championship:  2003 (with Lokomotiv Yaroslavl)
European Champions Cup:  2005 (with Avangard)
Pajulahti Cup:  2006 (with Severstal)

References

External links

 

1970 births
Living people
Avangard Omsk players
Boston Bruins players
Carolina Hurricanes players
Colorado Avalanche players
Edmonton Oilers players
HC CSKA Moscow players
HC Lada Togliatti players
Severstal Cherepovets players
Ice hockey players at the 1992 Winter Olympics
Ice hockey players at the 1998 Winter Olympics
Lokomotiv Yaroslavl players
Medalists at the 1998 Winter Olympics
Medalists at the 1992 Winter Olympics
Montreal Canadiens players
Olympic gold medalists for the Unified Team
Olympic ice hockey players of Russia
Olympic ice hockey players of the Unified Team
Olympic medalists in ice hockey
Olympic silver medalists for Russia
People from Balakovo
Philadelphia Flyers players
Quebec Nordiques draft picks
Quebec Nordiques players
Russian ice hockey right wingers
Soviet ice hockey right wingers
Torpedo Nizhny Novgorod players
Seventh convocation members of the State Duma (Russian Federation)